Events in the year 1853 in Mexico.

Incumbents

President and Cabinet
President: Juan Bautista Ceballos
President: Manuel María Lombardini
President: Antonio López de Santa Anna
Interior Secretary (SEGOB): Manuel Díez de Bonilla/Ignacio Aguilar

Governors
 Aguascalientes: José Cirilo Gómez Anaya
 Chiapas: Fernando Nicolás Maldonado/Domingo Ruiz Molina/Fernando Nicolás Maldonado
 Chihuahua: 
 Coahuila: 
 Durango:  
 Guanajuato: 
 Guerrero: 
 Jalisco: 
 State of Mexico:  
 Michoacán: 
 Nuevo León: Agapito García Dávila
 Oaxaca: 
 Puebla: 
 Querétaro: José Antonio Urrutia/Ramón María Loreto Canal de Samaniego/Ramón María Loreto Canal de Samaniego/José María Herrera y Lozada
 San Luis Potosí: 
 Sinaloa: 
 Sonora: 
 Tabasco: 
 Tamaulipas:	 
 Veracruz: 
 Yucatán: Miguel Barbachano
 Zacatecas:

Events

 December 30 – Gadsden Purchase: The United States buys land from Mexico to facilitate railroad building in the Southwest.

Deaths

January
 February 6 – Anastasio Bustamante, Mexican President (b. 1780)

June
 Lucas Alamán, Mexican statesman and historian (b. 1792)

References 

 
Years of the 19th century in Mexico